The Pratt & Whitney Wasp was the civilian name of a family of air-cooled radial piston engines developed in the 1930s, 1940s, and 1950s.

The Pratt & Whitney Aircraft Company (P&W) was founded in 1925 by Frederick B. Rentschler, who had previously been the President of Wright Aeronautical. He brought with him some of Wright's best designers and the new team quickly came up with their first design, the R-1340 Wasp.

Wasp series

 Pratt & Whitney R-1340 Wasp
 Pratt & Whitney R-985 Wasp Junior
 Pratt & Whitney R-1830 Twin Wasp
 Pratt & Whitney R-1535 Twin Wasp Junior
 Pratt & Whitney R-2000 Twin Wasp
 Pratt & Whitney R-2180-E Twin Wasp E 
 Pratt & Whitney R-2800 Double Wasp
 Pratt & Whitney R-4360 Wasp Major

Note: the designations refer to the engine configurations as follows: "R" = Radial, followed by the approximate displacement in cubic inches.

See also

References

Notes

Bibliography

External links
 Pratt & Whitney - Classic engines

Aircraft air-cooled radial piston engines
1930s aircraft piston engines
Wasp series